Money, A Mythology of Darkness (Greek: Το χρήμα - Μια μυθολογία του Σκότους) is a 1998 feature Greek film directed by the Greek director, writer and producer Vassilis Mazomenos. The film is the first European 3D animation feature film and deals with the influence of wealth on humanity. In 2015, The Hindu's film critic, Naman Ramachandran, called it "[t]he Greek film that is most relevant today..."

Synopsis 

A Christ-like figure explores the degeneration of society caused by the cult of wealth.

Background 
It was the first European feature 3D animation film. This was Mazomenos' third feature film, however he had previously worked with computer-generated images in The Triumph of Time, although these were two-dimensional.

Reception 
Vrasidas Karalis wrote in A History of Greek Cinema: 

Part of the film trilogy about the end of the West, that was presented and awarded in the 2001 retrospective in Fantasporto.

Awards 
1998: Greek State Film Awards (Second Prize for Documentary or Animated Film Awarded to Animated Film) - Won

1999: European Fantasy Award (George Melies Award) - Nominated

1999: Fantasporto Special Jury Award - Co-winner - Won

References 

1998 films
1998 animated films
Greek animated films
Greek drama films
1990s Greek-language films
Dystopian films
1998 fantasy films
Films about cities
Apocalyptic films
Films about religion
Films about Nazis
Greek avant-garde and experimental films
1990s avant-garde and experimental films
Non-narrative films
Films about time